Darnell Coles (born June 2, 1962) is an American professional baseball player and current hitting coach for the Washington Nationals of Major League Baseball (MLB). He played in MLB and Nippon Professional Baseball primarily as a third baseman and outfielder from 1983 to 1997. He has coached in MLB since 2014.

Early life
Coles was a four-sport letterman and three time baseball MVP at Eisenhower High School.

Playing career
On June 3, 1980, Coles was drafted by the Seattle Mariners in the first round (sixth pick) of the 1980 Major League Baseball Draft. He turned down both a baseball scholarship and a football scholarship to UCLA to sign with the Mariners.

In 1986, he hit a career-high 20 home runs for the Detroit Tigers. He had two three-home run games in his career: in 1987 with the Pittsburgh Pirates and in 1994 with the Toronto Blue Jays.

Coaching career
In 2006, Coles was hired as the roving hitting instructor for the Washington Nationals organization. He was the manager of the Vermont Lake Monsters in 2007, and manager of the Class A Hagerstown Suns in 2008.

On November 19, 2008, he was named the hitting coach for the Nationals Triple-A affiliate, the Syracuse Chiefs.

On October 10, 2013, Coles was selected to manage the Milwaukee Brewers Triple-A affiliate, the Nashville Sounds, after previously managing the organization's Double-A Huntsville Stars from 2012 to 2013. However, on November 25, the Detroit Tigers announced the hiring of Coles as assistant hitting coach.

On October 23, 2014, the Milwaukee Brewers announced Coles replaced Johnny Narron as the hitting coach. He resigned after the 2018 season and became the hitting coach for the Arizona Diamondbacks. On June 10, 2021, Coles was relieved of his position with the club. He was hired by the Washington Nationals to be their hitting coach following the 2021 season.

References

External links

1962 births
Living people
African-American baseball coaches
African-American baseball players
American expatriate baseball players in Canada
American expatriate baseball players in Japan
Arizona Diamondbacks coaches
Bakersfield Mariners players
Baseball coaches from California
Baseball players from California
Bellingham Mariners players
Calgary Cannons players
Chattanooga Lookouts players
Chunichi Dragons players
Cincinnati Reds players
Colorado Rockies players
Detroit Tigers players
Hanshin Tigers players
Major League Baseball hitting coaches
Major League Baseball outfielders
Major League Baseball third basemen
Milwaukee Brewers coaches
Minor league baseball managers
Nashville Sounds players
People from Rialto, California
Pittsburgh Pirates players
St. Louis Cardinals players
Salt Lake City Gulls players
San Francisco Giants players
Seattle Mariners players
Toronto Blue Jays players
Wausau Timbers players
African-American baseball managers
Phoenix Firebirds players
21st-century African-American people
20th-century African-American sportspeople